HC Odesa is an ice hockey team in Odesa, Ukraine. They played in Division B (the Southern group) of the Ukrainian Hockey League during the 2009-10 season. The club finished in second place in the group, with a record of two wins and six losses, with 26 goals for and 50 against.

They won the Black Sea Cup in 2010.

References

External links
Team profile on eurohockey.com

Ice hockey teams in Ukraine
Sport in Odesa